Hiroyoshi Shiratori (born 15 April 1933) is a Japanese weightlifter. He competed in the men's featherweight event at the 1956 Summer Olympics.

References

1933 births
Living people
Japanese male weightlifters
Olympic weightlifters of Japan
Weightlifters at the 1956 Summer Olympics
Place of birth missing (living people)